Luciano Antonio Macías Argencio (28 May 1935 – 5 August 2022) was an Ecuadorian soccer player who played as a defender in the NASL. He also played for the Ecuador national team.

Career statistics

Club

International

References

1935 births
2022 deaths
Ecuadorian footballers
Association football defenders
Ecuador international footballers
North American Soccer League (1968–1984) players
Barcelona S.C. footballers
Miami Toros players
Ecuadorian football managers
Barcelona S.C. managers
Ecuadorian expatriate footballers
Ecuadorian expatriate sportspeople in Venezuela
Expatriate footballers in Venezuela
Ecuadorian expatriate sportspeople in the United States
Expatriate soccer players in the United States
People from Santa Elena Province